Unpeeled is the second live album by American rock band Cage the Elephant. The album was released on July 28, 2017, and features the single "Whole Wide World". The album was recorded on tour during their "Live and Unpeeled" shows in cities such as Los Angeles, Washington DC, Nashville, and Knoxville where the band performed stripped-down renditions of some of the rock band's most beloved songs. The album has 21 tracks: 18 curated songs from past albums and three cover versions, including the lead single.

Guitarist Brad Shultz explained: "We connected with the songs in a way we hadn't before. It was really all about the balance of the intimacy and the delicacy of how we approach playing these songs live acoustically and with strings as we hadn't done before."

Singles 
"Whole Wide World", the cover of a song by Wreckless Eric, was the first single of the album and was released on June 21, 2017. A music video for the song was released the following day on June 22, and features the band playing live. A music video on July 7, 2017, for "Sweetie Little Jean" was released.

Recording 
Unpeeled produced by RCA Records, doesn't sound like a traditional live album. The reworkings are polished and sound as if it was recorded in a studio. The three covers on the album, include The Stranglers' "Golden Brown", Daft Punk's "Instant Crush" and "Whole Wide World" by Wreckless Eric. It was recorded to show how versatile their music can be. The band describes the acoustic covers accompanied with string, and a choir as "refreshing" and a fun "change in pace".

Critical reception 
Unpeeled received high reviews from music critics. According to review aggregator Metacritic, the album has an average critic review score of 72/100, based on 4 reviews. Writing for Under the Radar, Matt Raven describes the album as "daring" and states that "These new versions demonstrate the band's uncanny ability to construct alluring compositions that all start from a strong melodic framework."

Track listing

Credits 
Cage the Elephant
 Matt Shultz – lead vocals, acoustic guitar
 Brad Shultz – acoustic guitar
 Jared Champion – drums
 Daniel Tichenor – bass, acoustic guitar
 Nick Bockrath – acoustic guitar, pedal steel guitar, backing vocals, string arrangements

Additional musicians
 Emma Kleinberg Singers – choir
 Matthan Minster – keyboards, acoustic guitar, percussion, vibraphone, backing vocals
 Kyle Davis – additional percussion
 Gina Corso, Carl Larson, Avery Bright, Emily Nelson, Alexander F. Grimes, Kristin Weber, Austin Hoke, Andrea Vogt, Ryan Knotl, Preston Barbare, Natalie Spehar, Michael Polonchak, Kaitlin Moreno, Charles Callahan – strings

Charts

References 

2017 albums
Cage the Elephant albums
RCA Records live albums